Kharabeh (also Romanized as Kharābeh) is a village in Moqam Rural District, Shibkaveh District, Bandar Lengeh County, Hormozgan Province, Iran. At the 2006 census, its population was 164, in 33 families.

References 

Populated places in Bandar Lengeh County